The eighth season of The Voice van Vlaanderen premiered on September 30, 2022 on the VTM television network. It was announced in March 2022 that the show's eighth season would be returning in the second half of the year. Natalia Druyts and Koen Wauters returned for their seventh and eighth season, respectively. Jan Paternoster and Mathieu Terryn, who both founded a band of their own where they serve as a vocalist, joined the show as coaches for the first time, replacing Tourist LeMC and Niels Destadsbader. Meanwhile, Laura Tesoro returned for her second season as a coach of the Comeback Stage.

Louise Goedefroy was announced the winner of this season, marking Natalia Druyts' second consecutive win as a coach.

Coaches & Hosts 
Natalia Druyts, the winning coach of last season, and Koen Wauters returned for their seventh and eighth season, respectively. Jan Paternoster and Mathieu Terryn, who both founded a band of their own where they serve as a vocalist, joined the show as coaches for the first time, replacing Tourist LeMC and Niels Destadsbader. Meanwhile, Laura Tesoro returned for her second season as a coach of the Comeback Stage.

An Lemmens returned for her eighth consecutive season as the host, while Aaron Blommaert replaced Sean Dhondt as the backstage coach of the show. However, Gloria Monserez was the host for a couple of episodes while An Lemmens took a temporary break from the show to take care of her children. Lemmens returned when the Live Shows started airing.

Teams 

 Main competition color key
  Winner
  Runner-up
  Third Place
  Fourth Place
  Fifth Place
  Artist was Eliminated in the Lives
  Artist was Eliminated, but was selected to participate in the Comeback Stage
  Artist was Eliminated in the Battles
  Artist was Eliminated in the Knockouts, but was stolen by another coach
  Artist was Eliminated in Knockouts

 Comeback Stage color key
  Eliminated in the Third round
  Eliminated in the Second round
  Eliminated in the First round

Blind Auditions

Introduction 
The Blind Auditions premiered on September 30, 2022. Same as last season, artists who did not get any coach turned around would have the chance to compete in "The Comeback Stage" if selected by the fifth coach Laura Tesoro.

The Blind Auditions this season consist of 10 episodes, with two being broadcast each week.

In total, 83 contestants auditioned this season and 56 of them managed to turn at least one chair. Particularly, a total of 10 artists got a 'four-chair-turn' in this round. 11 artists were selected by the fifth coach Laura Tesoro to compete in "The Comeback Stage". Unfortunately, 23 contestants got eliminated straight away after no coaches turned for them.

Notes & Color Keys 

 Néhémi (age 23) in the first episode and Ruben (age 19) in the second episode are brothers.
 In the ninth episode, the contestant Robbe auditioned with the English version of "Denk Maar Niet Aan Morgen", which is a song by Bazart, the band founded by coach Mattieu. Right after Robbe chose to become a member of Team Mattieu, the coach performed the song with him.
 Joost Zwegers performed the single "Wrong" as a surprise for the coaches, wrapping up the tenth episode as well as the entire round of the Blind Auditions.

Blind Auditions Results

Knockouts 
This season, the show continued its twist on the original rules, switching the Knockouts and the Battles. During the Knockouts and the Battles, host An Lemmens took a break for maternity while Gloria Monserez joined Aaron Blommaert to host the show.

In the Knockouts, the artists in each team choose their own song to sing. After their performance, the coaches will have to decide whether to eliminate the artist straight away or put the artist in the 'Redzone' for further results, or to advance immediately.

The show introduced the 'Redzone' where contestants not guaranteed to advance to the next round wait for their coach's final decision. A maximum of three artists can end up in the 'Redzone' and the coach can choose only one of them to advance to the Battles. However, before an artist ends up in the 'Redzone', the other coaches first get the chance to use the one and only 'Steal' to secure the artist a spot on their team. If more than one coach presses their button to steal the artist, the artist in turn has the chance to choose a coach's team to advance.

Artists who were not chosen at the end of this round will have the chance to compete in "The Comeback Stage" if selected by the fifth coach Laura Tesoro.

Battles 
In this round, the coaches pair their artists for a singing match of two where they are given a song to sing together. The coaches then decide which of the two artists advance to the Live Shows. Artists who were not chosen at the end of this round will have the chance to compete in "The Comeback Stage" if selected by the fifth coach Laura Tesoro.

Lives 
The Lives comprise four weeks of performances, where 15 artists advanced from previous round compete for the final five spots in the finale and the opportunity to win this entire season.

The initial host An Lemmens returned to host the Lives after her hiatus in the Knockouts and the Battles where Gloria Monserez hosted the show alongside Aaron Blommaert.

Week 1: Top 15 
The 12 contestants, 3 per team, advanced from the Battles and the 3 contestants from "The Comeback Stage" who secured the spots of the Lives will have to compete to advance to the next week's Live show. For each team, the coach can only choose two artists out of three to advance. Artists who were not chosen will be eliminated.

Week 2: Top 10 
The remaining ten artists will have to compete for seven spots in the Semi-Final. For each team, after the performances of the two artists, the coach first chooses one artist to advance to the Semi-Final. The other artist will have to wait for the public to decide whether they will advance. Only two out of the five artists that were not chosen by their coach who received the highest votes from the public will advance.

Week 3: Semi-Final (Top 7) 
The Semi-Final aired on December 16. In the Semi-Final, the remaining seven artists will have to compete for the final five spots to advance to the Grand Final, regardless of what team they are on.

With the advancement of Evert and Yente, Mathieu Terryn became the only coach with two artists advanced to the Grand Final. With the elimination of Néhémie from Team Laura, this is the second consecutive time that Laura Tesoro as the coach for "The Comeback Stage" has no artists representing her in the Final.

Week 4: Grand Final (Top 5)
In the Grand Final, the five finalists of coaches Koen, Mathieu, Jan and Natalia will each perform one new solo song in Phase 1. Then the public chooses their three top finalists advancing to the second phase, eliminating the two artists with the fewest votes. The remaining three finalists will have to choose a song that they have performed in the previous rounds of this season to sing in the second phase. In the end, the contestant with the most votes in the second Phase will be crowned the winner of this season.

The five finalists performed the Miley Cyrus version of the classic Christmas song "Last Christmas" after they finished their performances in the first phase of the Grand Final, before the three finalists moving on to the next and last phase was revealed.

Louise Goedefroy representing coach Natalia Druyts was crowned the winner of this season, marking her coach's second consecutive win.

The Comeback Stage 
The show continued to feature "The Comeback Stage" where contestants who were eliminated from each round but were chosen by the fifth coach Laura Tesoro compete for extra spots for the Lives.

Round 1: Auditions 
The 11 artists who did not get any coach turned in the Blind Auditions but were selected by Laura competed in this round. Only two artists will advance to the next round. However, in the last episode of the Auditions (Episode 10), Laura decided to break the rules and take three artists to the next round. The three artists advanced to the next round are Glen Puylaert, Isis Hillé, and Ashley Feytons.

Round 2: Knockouts 
The three artists advanced from the Auditions and the seven artists who were eliminated by the other four coaches in the Knockouts will compete in this round for spots in the Battles for the "The Comeback Stage".

Round 3: Battles 
The five artists advanced from the Knockouts and the three artists who were eliminated by the other four coaches in the Battles will compete in this round for spots in the Lives. According to the rules, Laura has to choose two artists to advance to the Lives while the other two artists have to compete for the final spot by performing at the radio station Qmusic.

In episode 20, after Jordy and Sonny performed, Laura wanted to pair the two contestants and make a duo but was refused by the two artists. Laura chose not to make a decision and let the people listening to radio station Qmusic decide.

Extra Round: Radio @Qmusic 
After the Battles, five contestants were left. Laura had to choose two of them to go straight to the Live Rounds, they were Ashley and Néhémie. The other three contestants had to perform at a radio station (Qmusic) to fight for the last spot in the Live Rounds.

Elimination chart

Overall

Per team

References 

The Voice van Vlaanderen